The Girls Doubles tournament of the 2016 Badminton Asia Junior Championships was held from 13 to 17 July at the CPB Badminton and Sports Science Training Center in Bangkok, Thailand. Chinese pair Du Yue and Li Yinhui were the defending champion. Du Yue with her new partner Xu Ya won the 2016 title after beat their compatriot Ni Bowen and Zhou Chaomin in straight game 21–15, 21–16.

Seeded

 Apriyani Rahayu / Jauza Fadhila Sugiarto (third round)
 Ng Tsz Yau / Yeung Nga Ting (third round)
 Du Yue / Xu Ya (champion)
 Mychelle Chrystine Bandaso / Serena Kani (third round)
 Ruethaichanok Laisuan / Alisa Sapniti (semi-final)
 Tania Oktaviani Kusumah / Vania Arianti Sukoco (second round)
 Sayaka Hobara / Nami Matsuyama (third round)
 Natchpapha Chatupornkarnchana / Sanicha Chumnibannakarn (third round)

Draw

Finals

Top half

Section 1

Section 2

Section 3

Section 4

Bottom half

Section 5

Section 6

Section 7

Section 8

References

External links 
Main Draw

2016 Badminton Asia Junior Championships
Junior